The International Union of Immunological Societies (IUIS), a member of the International Council for Science, is an organization which serves as an umbrella organization for many national and regionally grouped immunological societies.  The organization was founded in 1969.  The ten founding member societies were the American Association of Immunologists, British Society for Immunology, Canadian Society for Immunology, Dutch Society for Immunology, Gesellschaft fur Immunologie, Israel Immunological Society, Polish Society of Immunology, Scandinavian Society for Immunology, Societe Francaise d’immunologie, and Yugoslav Immunological Society.  IUIS had 83 member societies in 2019.

The 2019-2022 executive committee of the IUIS is Faith Osier, President; Miriam Merad, Vice-President; Roslyn Kemp, Secretary General; Michael Ratcliffe, Treasurer; Alberto Mantovani, Past President.

Every three years the IUIS organizes an international congress, called the International Congress of Immunology (ICI), with one of its national society members. The 2016 ICI was held in Melbourne, Australia. Last ICI (rebranded as IUIS2019) took place in Beijing, China in 2019. Cape Town, South Africa will host IUIS2022.

Frontiers in Immunology is the IUIS' official journal. Immunopaedia.org is the official educational provider of online pre-course material for IUIS immunology courses in the developing world and in other countries.

The standing committees of the IUIS are Clinical Immunology, Education, Gender Equality and Career Development, Immunotherapy, Inborn Errors of Immunity, Nomenclature, Publications, Quality Assessment and Standardization, Vaccines, and Veterinary.

Among their activities is classification of primary immunodeficiency diseases.

Online immunology education
Immunopaedia, a non-profit educational website based in South Africa, is the official provider of online pre-course material for IUIS immunology courses.

See also
 Gustav Nossal
 Stefan H.E. Kaufmann

References

External links
 IUIS » International Union of Immunological Societies
 Frontiers in Immunology
 International Union of Immunological Societies records, 1969-2001  at the University of Maryland, Baltimore County
 Archival papers of Bernhard Cinade r, founder and first president of the society from 1966-1969, are held at University of Toronto Archives and Records Management Services

Members of the International Council for Science
International medical and health organizations
Immunology organizations
International organisations based in Germany
Members of the International Science Council